is a Japanese competitive swimmer and breaststroke specialist. He won the 100-meter event at the 2013 Summer Universiade, 2013 East Asian Games, and the 2014 Pan Pacific Swimming Championships. He hold the Asian record in this event, set in February 2014.

Since 2010 Koseki studied at the Nippon Sport Science University, where he first specialized in the freestyle, and only later changed to breaststroke, motivated by Kosuke Kitajima.

References

1992 births
Living people
Japanese male breaststroke swimmers
Asian Games medalists in swimming
Swimmers at the 2014 Asian Games
Swimmers at the 2018 Asian Games
Asian Games gold medalists for Japan
Asian Games silver medalists for Japan
Asian Games bronze medalists for Japan
Swimmers at the 2016 Summer Olympics
Olympic swimmers of Japan
Medalists at the 2014 Asian Games
Medalists at the 2018 Asian Games
World Aquatics Championships medalists in swimming
Universiade medalists in swimming
Universiade gold medalists for Japan
Universiade silver medalists for Japan
Medalists at the 2013 Summer Universiade
21st-century Japanese people